Bosch is an American police procedural television series produced by Amazon Studios. It stars Titus Welliver as Los Angeles Police detective Harry Bosch.

The first season of the show, developed for Amazon by Eric Overmyer, takes its inspiration from three of Michael Connelly's novels: City of Bones, Echo Park, and The Concrete Blonde. It was released in complete on February 13, 2015.

On March 18, 2015, Bosch was renewed for a second season, which takes inspiration from Connelly's novels Trunk Music, The Drop, and The Last Coyote. The second season premiered on March 11, 2016. The next season adapting The Black Echo and A Darkness More Than Night premiered on April 21, 2017. The fourth season, based on Angels Flight was released on April 13, 2018. The fifth season, based on 'Two Kinds Of Truth', was released on April 19, 2019. The sixth season, based on 'The Overlook' and 'Dark Sacred Night', was released a day early on April 16, 2020. The seventh and final season was released on June 25, 2021.

Series overview

Episodes

Season 1 (2015)

Season 2 (2016)

Season 3 (2017)

Season 4 (2018)

Season 5 (2019)

Season 6 (2020)

Season 7 (2021)

Notes

References

External links

Lists of American crime drama television series episodes